Tom Goodman-Hill is an English actor of film, television, theatre and radio.

Early life
Brought up near Newcastle upon Tyne, he qualified as a teacher before turning to acting. During his time in Newcastle, he regularly acted in amateur performances at the People's Theatre.

He earned a BA in Drama and English with a teaching qualification from the University of Warwick, where he took an active role in student drama. He spent a year as a supply teacher in Coventry before moving to London to pursue a full-time acting career.

Career

Film
In The League of Extraordinary Gentlemen Goodman-Hill played Sanderson Reed opposite Sean Connery. He is also known for playing Sgt Stahl in The Imitation Game and Neal Beidleman in Baltasar Kormakur's Everest in 2015. In 2020 Goodman-Hill played Frank Crawley in Ben Wheatley's film of the Daphne du Maurier classic Rebecca.

Television
Goodman-Hill is known for playing Joe Hawkins in Humans. He played PC in Ideal. He appeared in the Jonathan Creek episode 'Miracle in Crooked Lane' as Jeff, an episode of Murder in Mind, Series 5 of BBC One's Hustle as Alfie Baron and as the Reverend Golightly in Doctor Who episode ‘The Unicorn and the Wasp’.

He has had recurring parts in several comedies, including The Office as Ray, and Broken News. He also appeared as Brick Beckham in time-travelling comedy Goodnight Sweetheart.

In 2007 he played Richard Helm in an episode of ITV's Lewis.

In 2008 Goodman-Hill played John Lilburne in Channel 4's period drama, The Devil's Whore. Goodman-Hill can trace his father's family back to Lilburne's Uncle Joseph, through 16 generations. In 2011 he played Neil Hunter in drama Case Histories starring Jason Isaacs and in 2011 in Spy. In 2013–2016 Goodman-Hill played Mr Roger Grove in the ITV series Mr Selfridge and Dr Mawsley in The Thirteenth Tale for the BBC. He also appeared in episode 4 of series one of Call the Midwife and as Maurice Jones in a 2014 episode of ITV's Foyle's War entitled ‘The Russian House’. In 2015 he starred in Channel 4's Humans. He has also narrated all current seasons of Ultimate Airport Dubai.

In July 2016 Goodman-Hill played Assistant Commissioner Stone in the BBC's 3-part television adaptation of Joseph Conrad's 1907 novel The Secret Agent.

In March 2019 Goodman-Hill played Adam, the husband of Leah, in the ITV drama Cheat.

In February 2020 Goodman-Hill played DI Hewson in the BBC's Inside Number 9 in an episode called ‘Misdirection’.

Radio
Goodman-Hill has played numerous roles in various BBC Radio 4 productions, including: Jesus in Witness: Five Plays from the Gospel of Luke; Anton in The House of Milton Jones, Another Case of Milton Jones and Thanks a Lot, Milton Jones!; Ron, the security guard, in Self-Storage; Archie in three series of Hut 33; Claudius in I, Claudius; Martin in the episode ‘Newcastle’ in the third series of Cabin Pressure; Mason in My First Planet, and Søndergaard in the episode ‘Penguin Diplomacy’ in the second series of John Finnemore's Double Acts.

Theatre
Goodman-Hill started his professional career in the theatre. He has since appeared in productions such as Pete and Dud: Come Again as Peter Cook and The Cosmonaut's Last Message to the Woman He Once Loved in the Former Soviet Union as Eric. He received a Laurence Olivier Award nomination for the Best Performance in a Supporting Role in a Musical for his performance as Sir Lancelot (and other roles, mostly those played by John Cleese in the original film Monty Python and the Holy Grail), in the London production of Spamalot.

In 2009 he played Andrew Fastow, the former real-life CFO of Enron in Lucy Prebble's ENRON at Chichester and the Royal Court Theatre. The production transferred to the Noël Coward Theatre in January 2010 and in the interim he replaced Mark Gatiss in Darker Shores at the Hampstead Theatre during December 2009. Early in 2017 he appeared as David Owen in Limehouse at the Donmar Warehouse.

He is a patron of Scene & Heard, a charity providing theatre-based experiences for young people in Somers Town, London.

Personal life
Goodman-Hill has two children from his marriage to Kerry Bradley. In 2013 it was revealed that the couple had separated and that Goodman-Hill was in a relationship with actress Jessica Raine, whom he had met during the 2010 National Theatre's production of Earthquakes in London. Goodman-Hill and Raine married on 30 August 2015.
They have a son, born in 2019.

References

External links

Living people
Alumni of the University of Warwick
English male film actors
English male musical theatre actors
English male radio actors
English male stage actors
English male television actors
Male actors from London
Male actors from Newcastle upon Tyne
20th-century English male actors
21st-century English male actors
Year of birth missing (living people)